Hager House may refer to:

in the United States
(by state then city)
 Hager House (South Bend, Indiana), listed on the NRHP in St. Joseph County
 Otto J. Hager House, Waukon, Iowa, listed on the NRHP in Allamakee County
 Hager House (Hagerstown, Maryland), NRHP-listed
 Hager-Mead House, Waltham, Massachusetts, NRHP-listed